Rodrigo Nicolas Vila (born 23 October 1981 in Buenos Aires, Argentina) is a field hockey striker from Argentina, who made his debut for the national squad in 1998 and competed for his native country in the 2000 Summer Olympics, the 2004 Summer Olympics and 2012 Summer Olympics. His brothers Matías and Lucas are also a field hockey internationals for Argentina. Rodrigo has won three medals at the Pan American Games.

External links

 

1981 births
Living people
Argentine male field hockey players
Male field hockey forwards
Olympic field hockey players of Argentina
Field hockey players from Buenos Aires
Field hockey players at the 2000 Summer Olympics
2002 Men's Hockey World Cup players
Field hockey players at the 2004 Summer Olympics
2006 Men's Hockey World Cup players
Field hockey players at the 2007 Pan American Games
Field hockey players at the 2011 Pan American Games
World Series Hockey players
Field hockey players at the 2012 Summer Olympics
Pan American Games gold medalists for Argentina
Pan American Games silver medalists for Argentina
Pan American Games medalists in field hockey
South American Games gold medalists for Argentina
South American Games medalists in field hockey
Competitors at the 2006 South American Games
Medalists at the 2007 Pan American Games
Medalists at the 2011 Pan American Games
21st-century Argentine people